Broughton Cross is a hamlet in the Allerdale district, in the county of Cumbria, England. Nearby settlements include the villages of Brigham and Great Broughton. It was on the A66 road until it was by-passed. It had a railway station called Broughton Cross railway station which opened on 28 April 1847 and closed on 2 March 1942.

References 

Hamlets in Cumbria
Allerdale